Thomas Trott (by 1483 – 1524 or later), of Bodmin, Cornwall, was an English politician.

He was a Member of Parliament (MP) for Bodmin in 1515.

References

15th-century births
16th-century deaths
English MPs 1515
People from Bodmin
Members of the pre-1707 English Parliament for constituencies in Cornwall